Samuel Seligsohn (23 December 1814 – 3 October 1866) was a Prussian Hebrew poet, who published the epos Ha-Aviv (Berlin, 1845). Another epos, on the destruction of Jerusalem, and various essays by him remained in manuscript.

Publications

References
 

1814 births
1866 deaths
19th-century Prussian people
Epic poets
Hebrew-language poets
People from Szamocin
People from the Grand Duchy of Posen
People from the Province of Posen